APRT may refer to:
 Adenine phosphoribosyltransferase, an enzyme
 Adenine phosphoribosyltransferase deficiency, a genetic and metabolic disorder